Fight Song is the debut extended play (EP) released by American singer and songwriter Rachel Platten on May 12, 2015 by Columbia Records, her first release for the label. The EP includes the top-10 single of the same name, "Fight Song", and was released in promotion of Platten's debut major-label album, Wildfire (2016). Fight Song peaked at number 20 on the Billboard 200, and has sold 26,000 copies in the US as of December 2015.

Critical reception 
Marcy Donelson of AllMusic praised the "relatably introspective" lyrical content of the extended play and deemed the "pure anthem pop" style akin to a more sincere Katy Perry. Mike Wass of Idolator called the collection "excellent," noting how it builds on the success of the title track while also "[proving] there’s more to [Platten] than uplifting, self-help anthems."

Track listing

Charts

Weekly charts

Year-end charts

References 

2015 debut EPs
Rachel Platten albums
Columbia Records EPs